William Patrick Zalatoris (born August 16, 1996) is an American professional golfer. He has competed primarily on the PGA Tour, where he has won once, at the 2022 FedEx St. Jude Championship . He also has three runner-up finishes in major championships.

College career
Zalatoris was born in San Francisco, California. 

Representing Trinity Christian Academy in Addison, a suburb of Dallas, Texas, Zalatoris won the U.S. Junior Amateur title in 2014. He attended Wake Forest University in North Carolina, and was named ACC Player of the Year in 2017. In his junior year, Zalatoris was named All-ACC, First-Team GCAA All-American, First-Team Golf week All-American, Nicklaus Award finalist, Hogan Award semifinalist, played in all 12 events and had a scoring average of 70.14, third-best season average in school history. He was also a member of the U.S. Walker Cup team in 2017, teammates with future PGA Tour winners Collin Morikawa and Cameron Champ. He left school after his junior year to turn professional.

Professional career
Zalatoris turned professional in 2018 but failed to make it past First Stage of the Korn Ferry Tour Q School. With no status in 2019, Zalatoris relied on Monday qualifying and sponsor exemptions to play in Korn Ferry Tour events. He secured membership for the remainder of the season on July 7 after a tie for third at the LECOM Health Challenge, and finished the regular season 60th in points, earning full status for the 2020 season.

Zalatoris' first professional victory came in July 2020, when he narrowly won the TPC Colorado Championship by one stroke. The win moved him to the leader on the Korn Ferry Tour points list and qualified him for the U.S. Open at Winged Foot. At the U.S. Open, he aced the par-3 seventh hole during the first round, very nearly replicating it six holes later, and tied for sixth place, at five-over par, alongside world number one Dustin Johnson; it was his first top-10 finish in a major championship. He followed it up with a T8 at the Corales Puntacana Resort and Club Championship, and secured Special Temporary Member status after the Bermuda Championship in early November. 

In April 2021, Zalatoris was second in the Masters Tournament with a score of 9-under-par, finishing one stroke behind champion Hideki Matsuyama, the first male Japanese player to win a major. Zalatoris was voted PGA Tour Rookie of the Year for the 2020–21 season.

In October 2021, Zalatoris shot his career low round (61) on the PGA Tour at the Sanderson Farms Championship in Jackson, Mississippi.

In January 2022, Zalatoris tied for the lead of the Farmers Insurance Open after 72 holes. He lost a sudden-death playoff to Luke List when List hit his approach shot to a foot away from the first playoff hole and made birdie.

In May 2022, Zalatoris finished second in a major championship for the second time. He lost to Justin Thomas in a playoff in the PGA Championship at Southern Hills in Tulsa, Oklahoma.

In June 2022, Zalatoris had another second place in a major championship. He finished tied with Scottie Scheffler at the U.S. Open behind Matt Fitzpatrick at The Country Club in Brookline, Massachusetts.

On August 14, 2022, Zalatoris won his first PGA Tour event, winning the FedEx St. Jude Championship at TPC Southwind in Memphis, Tennessee on the third playoff hole against Sepp Straka. The event was the first of three events in the 2022 FedEx Cup Playoffs, With his win, Zalatoris moved to first in the FedEx Cup standings ahead of Scottie Scheffler.

Amateur wins
2014 U.S. Junior Amateur
2016 Trans-Mississippi Amateur, Pacific Coast Amateur
2017 General Hackler Championship, Rod Myers Invitational

Source:

Professional wins (2)

PGA Tour wins (1)

PGA Tour playoff record (1–2)

Korn Ferry Tour wins (1)

Playoff record
European Tour playoff record (0–1)

Results in major championships
Results not in chronological order before 2019 and in 2020.

CUT = missed the half-way cut
"T" = tied
WD = withdrew
NT = No tournament due to COVID-19 pandemic

Summary

Most consecutive cuts made – 4 (2022 Masters - 2022 Open Championship, current)
Longest streak of top-10s – 3 (twice)

Results in The Players Championship

"T" indicates a tie for a place

Results in World Golf Championships

1Canceled due to COVID-19 pandemic

QF, R16, R32, R64 = Round in which player lost in match play
"T" = Tied
NT = No tournament
Note that the Championship and Invitational were discontinued from 2022.

U.S. national team appearances
Amateur
The Spirit International Amateur Golf Championship: 2015 (winners)
Arnold Palmer Cup: 2016
Walker Cup: 2017 (winners)

See also
2021 Korn Ferry Tour Finals graduates

References

External links

Wake Forest University Athletics – Will Zalatoris

American male golfers
PGA Tour golfers
Wake Forest Demon Deacons men's golfers
Golfers from San Francisco
Golfers from Texas
Sportspeople from Plano, Texas
1996 births
Living people